Lenin Volga–Don Shipping Canal (Russian:Волго-Донской судоходный канал имени, В. И. Ленина, Volga-Donskoy soudokhodniy kanal imeni V. I. Lenina, abbreviated ВДСК, VDSK) is a ship canal in Russia. It connects the Volga and the Don at their closest points.

The canal forms a part of the Unified Deep Water System of European Russia. Together with the lower Volga and the lower Don, the canal provides the shortest navigable connection between the Caspian Sea and the world's oceans, if the Mediterranean is counted, via the Sea of Azov and the Black Sea.

History

There has been a trade and military route between the Volga and Don rivers from early human history.

The existence of fortified settlement Tanais in the Don River delta, present since a time in the Bosporan Kingdom  438 BC–
370 AD, strongly suggests the route may have been notable enough to be fortified for more than two thousand years. The Sarkel fortress, on the near (left bank) of the lower Don, was the main control of this Volga trade route.

The Don–Volga portage got its name from its trade importance 1000 years ago.

In 1569, the Ottoman Empire attempted to connect the Volga and Don rivers via a canal. The Ottomans wanted to create a maritime link to Central Asia (especially the cities of Bukhara, Khwarazm and Samarkand) to facilitate trade. Together with a proposed Suez canal, the Volga-Don canal would also allow Central Asian Muslims to perform pilgrimage to Mecca. According to most historians, the Ottomans managed to dig one-third of the canal, before work was abandoned due to adverse weather. Other historians argue that the Ottomans merely leveled the ground so they could haul ships between the two rivers. In the end, the Ottomans retreated from the area and Russia promised to respect trade and pilgrimage routes to Central Asia.

The first Russian attempts to connect the Volga and Don rivers were ordered by Peter the Great. After capturing Azov in 1696, he decided to build a canal, later named Petrov Val, on the Ilovlya River (a left tributary of the Don) and the Kamyshinka river (right tributary of the Volga). Compared to the canal it was much shorter, connecting a gap of 4 kilometers (2.5 mi), but due to a lack of resources and other problems, this attempt was abandoned in 1701. He initiated a second attempt (the so-called Ivanovsky Canal between Yepifan and Ivan-Ozero) under the administration of Knyaz Matvey Gagarin. However it was too shallow, as it was on the upper Don and the upper Volga via the tributaries the Oka River, the Upa River, and the Shat River in the modern Tula Oblast. Between 1702 and 1707, twenty-four locks were constructed, and in 1707, about 300 ships passed through with difficulty. In 1709 due to financial difficulties caused by the Great Northern War, the project was halted.

In 1711, under the terms of the Treaty of the Pruth, Russia left Azov and Peter the Great lost all interest in the canal, which was abandoned and fell into ruin. Over time, other projects for connecting the two rivers were proposed, but none were attempted. However, Dubovsko-Kachalinsky railway, which was horse-drawn railway and Volga–Don railway, which is now part of the South Eastern Railway were built in 1846 and 1852 respectively in order link the Volga and the Don at the shortest distance. They were 68 km and 73 km long respectively.

The construction of today's Volga–Don Canal, designed by Sergey Zhuk's Hydroproject Institute, began prior to the Second World War, which interrupted the process. Construction works continued from 1948 to 1952 and the canal was opened on 1 June 1952. The canal and its facilities were built by about 900,000 workers including some 100,000 German POWs and 100,000 gulag prisoners. A day spent at the construction yard was counted as three days in prison, which spurred the prisoners to work. Several convicts were even awarded the Order of the Red Banner of Labour upon their release.

Upon completion, the Volga–Don Canal became an important link in the Unified Deep Water Transportation System of the European part of the USSR.

Operation

It ends in the Tsimlyansk Reservoir of the Don at the town of Kalach-na-Donu. It uses nine one-chamber canal locks on the Volga slope to raise/lower ships , and four canal locks of the same kind on the Don slope that raise/lower ships  from river height. The overall dimensions of the locks are smaller than those on the Volga River, however they can bear ships of up to 5,000 tonnes cargo capacity.

The canal is filled from the Don, with three powerful pumping stations that maintain water levels. Water is also taken from the canal and used for irrigation.

Cargo transported from the Don region to the Volga include: coal from Donetsk, Ukraine, minerals (both directions), building materials, and grain. Cargo transported from the Volga to the Don includes lumber, pyrites, and petroleum products (carried mostly by Volgotanker boats).

Tourist cruisers travel in both directions.

The canal and the Tsimlyansky water-engineering system (whose chief architect was Leonid Polyakov), form part of an architectural ensemble dedicated to the battles for Tsaritsyn during the Russian Civil War and for Stalingrad during the German-Soviet War.

The Russian classical composer Sergei Prokofiev wrote the tone poem The Meeting of the Volga and the Don to celebrate its completion.

According to the Maritime Board (Morskaya Kollegiya) of the Russian government, 10.9 million tonnes of cargo were carried over the Volga–Don Canal in 2004.

An alternate source claims 8.05 million tonnes of cargo was transported through the canal in 2006. Most of the cargo was moved from the east to the west: 7.20 million tonnes, and only 0.85 million tonnes the reverse. Just over half of all cargo was oil or oil products (4.14 million tonnes), predominantly shipped from the Caspian region.

It was reported in 2007 that in the first 55 years of the canal's operations 450,000 vessels had passed through carrying 336 million tonnes of cargo. Recent cargo volume stood at 12 million tonnes a year.

In 2016, the core of Belarusian nuclear power plant VVER-1200, which weighed 330 tonnes, was 13 meters high, and 4.5 meters in diameter, was transferred to its destination by exploiting Tsimlyansk Reservoir, the Volga–Don Canal, the Volga–Baltic Waterway, and two other connections.

Stamp gallery

Future options
In the 1980s, construction started on a second canal between the rivers. The new canal, dubbed Volga–Don 2 would start from the township of Yerzovka on the Volgograd Reservoir, north (upstream) of the Volga Dam, as opposed to the existing Volga–Don Canal that starts south (downstream) of the dam. This would cut the number of locks that ships coming from the Volgograd Reservoir, or from any other Volga or Kama port farther north, would have to traverse on their way to the Don. The project was abruptly cancelled on 1 August 1990 to cut expenditure, by which time more than 40 percent of its funds had already been spent. Since then most of the stone and metal in the abandoned canal and its locks has been looted.

As of 2007–2008, Russian authorities are considering two options for increasing the throughput of navigable waterways between the Caspian basin and the Black Sea. This plan would allow for an increase in the canal's annual cargo throughput from 16.5 million tonnes to 30 million tonnes. The other option, which seems to have more support from Kazakhstan, who would be either canal's major customer, is to build the so-called Eurasia Canal along a more southerly route in the Kuma–Manych Depression, some of which is the much shallower Manych Ship Canal. Needing less digging than the first option and of little use to traffic to and from the Volga, it would provide a speedier connection between the Caspian and the Sea of Azov. It would also require fewer locks than the Volga–Don, as elevations in the Kuma–Manych Depression are lower.

See also
Volgodonsk
Yergeni
 White Sea–Baltic Canal
 Unified Deep Water System of European Russia

References

External links 

1952 establishments in the Soviet Union
Canals in Russia
Canals opened in 1952
CVolga-Don
Gulag industry
Ship canals
Transport in Volgograd Oblast
CVolga-Don
Cultural heritage monuments of regional significance in Volgograd Oblast